KSPI (780 AM) is a radio station licensed to Stillwater, Oklahoma, United States. The station is owned by Stillwater Broadcasting, LLC.

According to the station's website, KSPI has been operational since 1947.

On October 1, 2016 KSPI changed their format from sports to alternative rock, branded as "Pete 94.3". The AM frequency and the FM translator K232FI 94.3 FM Stillwater carry slightly different programming, as indicated on the stations website for AM  and for FM.

Translators

Previous logo

References

External links

 

SPI
Modern rock radio stations in the United States
Radio stations established in 1947
1947 establishments in Oklahoma
SPI